Stephanie Bennett may refer to:
 Stephanie Bennett (actress), Canadian actress
 Stephanie Bennett (producer), English film producer
 Stephanie Bennett (harpist), American harpist